This article serves as an index – as complete as possible – of all the honorific orders or similar decorations awarded by Denmark, classified by Monarchies chapter and Republics chapter, and, under each chapter, recipients' countries and the detailed list of recipients.

Awards

MONARCHIES 
 European monarchies

Danish Royal Family 
Official website pages (click on "Decorations"): Margrethe - Henrik - Frederik - Mary - Joachim - Marie - Benedikte

 Margrethe II of Denmark :
 Knight of the Order of the Elephant (20 April 1947)
 Grand Commander of the Order of Dannebrog
 Frederik, Crown Prince of Denmark :
 Knight of the Order of the Elephant (14 January 1972)
 Grand Commander of the Order of the Dannebrog
 Mary, Crown Princess of Denmark: Knight of the Order of the Elephant (9 May 2004)
 Prince Joachim of Denmark :
 Knight of the Order of the Elephant (14 January 1972)
 Grand Commander of the Order of the Dannebrog
 Princess Marie of Denmark: Knight of the Order of the Elephant (24 May 2008)
 Alexandra, Countess of Frederiksborg: Knight of the Order of the Elephant (17 November 1995) 
 Princess Benedikte of Denmark: Knight of the Order of the Elephant (20 April 1947) 
 Count Ingolf of Rosenborg, former Prince of Denmark: Knight of the Order of the Elephant (17 February 1961)

Commonwealth realms' royal family 
 The Queen:   1947 - Knight of the Order of the Elephant
 The Prince of Wales: 1974 – - Knight of the Order of the Elephant - RE

Norwegian Royal Family 
See also decorations pages (mark °): Harald, Sonja, Haakon, Mette-Marit, Mârtha Louise, Astrid & Ragnhild

 Harald V of Norway:
 Knight with Collar of the Order of the Elephant ° (21.2.1958)
 Grand Commander of the Order of the Dannebrog ° (28.10.1991)
 Queen Sonja of Norway: Knight of the Order of the Elephant° (12.2.1973)
 Haakon, Crown Prince of Norway: Knight of the Order of the Elephant° (20.7.1991)
 Princess Märtha Louise of Norway: Knight of the Order of the Elephant° (13.10.1992)

Swedish Royal Family   
 Carl XVI Gustaf of Sweden :
 Knight with Collar of the Order of the Elephant (12.1.1965) - Grand Commander of the Order of the Dannebrog (10.4.1975)
 Queen Silvia of Sweden: Knight with Collar of the Order of the Elephant (3.9.1985)
 Victoria, Crown Princess of Sweden: Knight of the Order of the Elephant (14 July 1995)

Dutch Royal Family 
 King Willem-Alexander of the Netherlands:  Knight of the Order of the Elephant (31 January 1998)
 Princess Beatrix of the Netherlands: Knight of the Order of the Elephant (29 October 1975)

Belgian Royal Family 

 King Philippe:  Knight of the Order of the Elephant (2002)
 King Albert II :
 Knight of the Order of the Elephant 
 Grand Cross of the Order of the Dannebrog (to be checked)
 Queen Paola: Knight of the Order of the Elephant

Luxembourgish Grand-Ducal Family 

 Henri, Grand Duke of Luxembourg: Knight of the Order of the Elephant 
 Maria Teresa, Grand Duchess of Luxembourg: Knight of the Order of the Elephant

Spanish Royal Family 
 Juan Carlos I of Spain: Knight of Order of the Elephant (17.3.1980)
 Queen Sofía of Spain: Knight of the Order of the Elephant (17.3.1980)
 Felipe IV of Spain: Knight of Order of the Elephant 

 Asian monarchies

Jordanian Royal Family 
 Dowager Queen Noor al-Hussein: Knight of the Order of the Elephant (27 April 1998) 
 Prince Ali Bin Al-Hussein, son of Queen Alia of Jordan, half-brother of Abdullah II of Jordan: Grand Cross of the Order of the Dannebrog (27.4.1998) 
 Prince Muhammad bin Talal, eldest younger brother of King Hussein I of Jordan: Grand Cross of the Order of the Dannebrog

Thai Royal Family 

 King Maha Vajiralongkorn of Thailand: Knight of the Order of the Elephant (7 February 2001)
 Queen Sirikit of Thailand: Knight of the Order of the Elephant (6 September 1960)
 Princess Sirindhorn of Thailand: Grand Cross of the Order of the Dannebrog, 2001

Japanese Imperial Family 
 Emperor Akihito: Knight Grand Cross of the Order of the Elephant (8.8.1953)
 Empress Michiko: Member of the Order of the Elephant (2.6.1998)
 Crown Prince Naruhito: Knight of the Order of the Elephant (16.11.2004)
 Prince Hitachi (Masahito): Knight of the Order of the Elephant (28.9.1965)

Former Monarchies

Greek Royal Family 

 Constantine II, former King of the Hellenes: Knight of the Order of the Elephant (4 January 1962)
 Anne-Maria, former Queen of the Hellenes, Princess of Denmark (20 April 1947)
 Crown Prince Pavlos of Greece, Prince of Denmark: Knight of the Order of the Elephant (14 January 1997)
 Princess Irene of Greece and Denmark, Constantine II's sister: Knight of the Order of the Elephant (11 September 1964)
 Prince Michael of Greece and Denmark, Prince Christopher's son: Knight of the Order of the Elephant (11 September 1964)

Iranian Imperial Family 
 Former Empress Farah, of Iran: Knight of the Order of the Elephant (3 May 1963)

REPUBLICS

former President Fernando Henrique Cardoso: Knight of the Order of the Elephant (3 May 1999)
 former President Luiz Inácio Lula da Silva: Knight of the Order of the Elephant (12 September 2007)

former President Petar Stoyanov: Knight of the Order of the Elephant (17 October 2000)
 President Georgi Parvanov: Knight of the Order of the Elephant (29 March 2006) 
 Zorka Petrova Parvanova, his wife: Grand Cross of the Order of the Dannebrog (2006)

former President Mohamed Hosni Mubarak: Knight of the Order of the Elephant (19 February 1986)

former President Martti Ahtisaari:  Knight of the Order of the Elephant (7 September 1994)
 President Tarja Halonen: Knight of the Order of the Elephant (3 April 2001)

Former President Valéry Giscard d'Estaing (1974-1981): Knight of the Order of the Elephant (12 October 1978)

President Karolos Papoulias: Knight of the Order of the Elephant (24 May 2006)

former President Vigdís Finnbogadóttir: Knight of the Order of the Elephant (25 February 1981)
 President Ólafur Ragnar Grímsson: Knight of the Order of the Elephant (18 November 1996)

former President Guntis Ulmanis: Knight of the Order of the Elephant (18 March 1997)

Former President Lech Wałęsa: Knight of the Order of the Elephant (5 July 1993)

President Felipe Calderón Hinojosa: Knight of the Order of the Elephant (18 February 2008)
 Margarita Zavala, his wife: Grand Cross of the Order of the Dannebrog (18 February 2008)

former President António Santos Ramalho Eanes: Knight of the Order of the Elephant (25 June 1984)

former President Emil Constantinescu: Knight of the Order of the Elephant (23 May 2000) 
 former President Ion Iliescu: Knight of the Order of the Elephant (16 March 2004)

President Ivan Gašparovič: Knight of the Order of the Elephant (October 2012) 
 Silvia Gašparovičová, his wife: Grand Cross of the Order of the Dannebrog (October 2012)

former President Milan Kučan: Knight of the Order of the Elephant (10 October 2001)

President Lee Myung-bak: Knight of the Order of the Elephant (11 May 2011)

See also 
 List of Knights of the Order of the Elephant

References 

 
Danish